Colin Alexander Cunningham (born 1966) is an American television and film actor. Cunningham is best known for his roles as John Pope in the TNT science fiction series Falling Skies and as Major/Lt.Col Paul Davis on Stargate SG-1 and Stargate Atlantis.

Career
Cunningham began his acting career when he was dared by a friend to audition for a role in a public casting call. He was part of the founding company of the Open Fist Theatre Company, and he studied directing at the Vancouver Film School.

He had a recurring role on Stargate SG-1 as USAF Major Paul Davis (15 episodes).  Another major role was his portrayal of Brian Curtis, a crooked cop, in the popular, award-winning Canadian series Da Vinci's Inquest.  He reprises the role of Brian Curtis in the 2006 sequel series, Da Vinci's City Hall. He appeared as Steven Lefkowitz in the short-lived jPod and in several episodes of The L Word. Other appearances include the Canadian series Flashpoint and in Sanctuary, where he plays the husband of a biologist friend of Henry Foss. His most notable role is as John Pope on Falling Skies

He also gained critical acclaim as Master of Ceremonies, Julian Slink in the Syfy series Blood Drive.

He starred as an anti-clone activist named Tripp in the 2000 thriller The 6th Day, and as the character McCabe in the 2005 film Elektra.

He wrote, directed, and starred in a short film titled Centigrade, a contemporary thriller. It was the winner of the 2007 Kick Start Award and in 2008 made the 'short list' for an Academy Award Nomination.

In addition to acting, he has directed numerous music videos for Country Music Television (CMT). He plays tenor saxophone and is band leader for the funk/soul band WHAT-THE-FUNK!, which was formed in 2013.

Filmography

References

External links 

 
 Colin's Facebook Page
 Colin Cunningham on Twitter
 Centigrade the Movie (official Centigrade website)
 Falling Skies site
 Colin Cunningham Fans (Official Fan Club)

1966 births
Male actors from Los Angeles
American male film actors
American male television actors
Living people